Azenhas do Mar is a seaside town (residential neighborhood) in the municipality of Sintra, Portugal. It is part of Colares civil parish. Azenhas do Mar means Watermills of the Sea and the name derives from a once-powerful stream that moved the watermills as it made its way to the sea.

The place is a Mediterranean-looking village with white houses tumbling down to the Atlantic. In the mid-20th century, wealthy families from Lisbon and Sintra decided that the location was perfect for summer homes, which can be seen outside the main cluster of houses which originally were the homes of a fishing community.

There a number of popular beaches located near the Azenhas do Mar, namely Praia da Aguda, Praia do Magoito (mostly frequented by locals and surfers), and Praia das Maçãs.

Near Praia das Maçãs there is a Prehistoric Monument, also known as the Tholos of Outeiro das Mós, consists of an artificial Neolithic cave and a Chalcolithic domed or beehive tomb.

References

External links
 Azenhas do Mar – A Rare View

Towns in Portugal